Dunan may refer to:

 Dúnán, (also as Donatus or Donat) an 11th-century  bishop of Dublin
 Dunan, Skye, a settlement in Scotland
 Dunan, the native name of the Yonaguni Island in Japan
 Dunan, the Yonaguni language